SS Denebola was a  cargo steam ship built by Neptun Werft of Rostock, Germany, in 1899 and powered by a triple-expansion steam engine of 133 nhp. She carried a crew of 21.

Ownership
Holm & Molzen of Flensburg 
Everett & Newbegin of Newcastle-upon-Tyne

Incidents

Fate
Denebola was torpedoed by German submarine  on 17 August 1918 while en route from Swansea bound for Rouen. While passing  N by W from Gurnard Head near St Ives, Cornwall she was struck by two torpedoes which hit near number two and three holds, causing her to sink rapidly. The crew took to a boat and a raft and were later picked up by a patrol vessel. The second engineer and one able seaman were lost.

References

Steamships of Germany